Adair County is a county in the U.S. state of Iowa.  As of the 2020 census, the population was 7,496. Its county seat is Greenfield.

History
Adair County was formed in 1851 from sections of Pottawattamie County.  It was named for John Adair, a general in the War of 1812, and the eighth Governor of Kentucky.

Geography

Major highways
 Interstate 80
 U.S. Highway 6
 Iowa Highway 25
 Iowa Highway 92

Adjacent counties
Guthrie County  (north)
Madison County  (east)
Union County  (southeast)
Adams County  (southwest)
Cass County  (west)

Demographics

2020 census
There were 3,585 housing units of which 3,217 were occupied.

2010 census
As of the 2010 United States Census, there were 7,682 people, 3,292 households, and 2,148 families residing in the county. The racial makeup of the county was 98.4% white, 0.3% Asian, 0.1% American Indian, 0.1% black or African American, 0.4% from other races, and 0.7% from two or more races. Those of Hispanic or Latino origin made up 1.3% of the population. In terms of ancestry, 42.9% were German, 12.6% were Irish, 11.9% were English, 6.7% were Danish, and 6.4% were American.

Of the 3,292 households, 26.8% had children under the age of 18 living with them, 54.9% were married couples living together, 6.7% had a female householder with no husband present, 34.8% were non-families, and 30.7% of all households were made up of individuals. The average household size was 2.29 and the average family size was 2.84. The median age was 45.3 years.

The median income for a household in the county was $45,202 and the median income for a family was $57,287. Males had a median income of $38,638 versus $31,642 for females. The per capita income for the county was $23,497. About 5.7% of families and 10.6% of the population were below the poverty line, including 13.5% of those under age 18 and 11.4% of those age 65 or over.

Religion
, 67.9% of the population (5,597) had a declared religious affiliation, in every case Christian. The leading religious denomination was the United Methodist Church, with 23.6% of the population (1,944 members); second was the Lutheran Church–Missouri Synod, with 15.4% (1,268 members); third was the Roman Catholic church, with 12% of the population (1,003 members); and fourth was the Evangelical Lutheran church, with 11.8% of the population (978 members).

Education
The county is served by five school districts:
Nodaway Valley Community School District
Orient-Macksburg Community School District.
CAM Community School District
Adair–Casey Community School District.
West Central Valley Community School District

The schools in the Nodaway Valley Community School District are:
Nodaway Valley Elementary School
Nodaway Valley Middle School
Nodaway Valley High School.

The schools in the Orient-Macksburg Community School District are:
Orient-Macksburg Elementary School
Orient-Macksburg Middle School and High School.
The schools in the CAM Community School District are:

 CAM North Elementary School
 CAM South Elementary School
 CAM Middle School
 CAM High School
 CAM Iowa Connections Academy Elementary
 CAM Iowa Connections Academy Middle School
 CAM Iowa Connections Academy High School

The schools in the Adair–Casey Community School District are:

 Adair–Casey Elementary School
 AC/GC Junior High School
 Under a grade-sharing relationship with Guthrie Center Community School District, students attend AC/GC High School in Guthrie Center.

The schools in the West Central Valley Community School District are:

 Dexter Elementary School
 Stuart Elementary School
 Redfield Middle School
 Stuart High School

Communities

Cities
Adair
Bridgewater
Casey
Fontanelle
Greenfield
Orient
Stuart

Townships
Adair County is divided into sixteen townships:

 Eureka
 Grand River

 Grove
 Harrison
 Jackson
 Jefferson
 Lee
 Lincoln
 Orient
 Prussia
 Richland
 Summerset
 Summit
 Union
 Walnut
 Washington

Population ranking
The population ranking of the following table is based on the 2020 census of Adair County.

† county seat

Politics
The county was part of Iowa's 5th congressional district, which had a score of R+9 (strongly Republican) in the Cook Partisan Voting Index.

See also

National Register of Historic Places listings in Adair County, Iowa

References

Further reading 

 
 

External links

http://www.visitadaircounty.com

 
Populated places established in 1851
1851 establishments in Iowa